Spencer Dunn is a New Zealand former rugby league footballer who represented New Zealand in the 1968 World Cup.

Playing career
Dunn was originally from the West Coast but moved to Christchurch to play for Papanui in the Canterbury Rugby League competition. He made the Canterbury side in 1967 and played for Southern Zone against Northern Zone and New South Wales Country. Dunn played for the New Zealand national rugby league team in the 1968 World Cup. He was selected for the 1969 New Zealand under-23 tour of New South Wales but had to withdraw due to injury.

References

Living people
New Zealand rugby league players
New Zealand national rugby league team players
Canterbury rugby league team players
Papanui Tigers players
Rugby league wingers
Rugby league centres
Year of birth missing (living people)